The Port of Eilat is the only Israeli port on the Red Sea, located at the northern tip of the Gulf of Aqaba.

History

The Port of Eilat was declared in 1952, and constructed between 1952-56. Today it is mainly used for trading with Far East countries. It allows Israeli shipping to reach the Indian Ocean without having to sail through the Suez Canal. 

Egyptian naval blockades of the Straits of Tiran which control access to Eilat featured prominently in the events which led to two major Arab-Israeli Conflicts: The Sinai War and the Six-Day War.

Ship traffic at Eilat is relatively low (compared to Israel's two large seaports on the Mediterranean). One reason is that Eilat is situated at a considerable distance from the center of the country. Another is the fact that unlike the country's other main seaports, Eilat's is yet to be served by a railway line (the nearest railhead is located over a hundred kilometers to the north at Dimona). Also, coastal tourism uses compete with any prospects of expanding the port's facilities.

Patrol Boats Squadron 915 of the Israeli Navy is based here.

Development plans
To alleviate the limitations imposed on the port's development, the government has proposed the "Southern Gateway" plan for the area. This proposal entails the construction of a massive combined air-rail-sea logistical center to be located in the desert north of the city. The details of this proposal include: relocating the current port to an excavated area north of the city, reachable by a -wide, -long canal built alongside the Jordanian border from the Gulf of Aqaba, the construction of a new international airport within the vicinity (finished in 2019), and the extension of the railway from the Nahal Zin railhead to the port and airport. International investors such as the South African Harris Group of Companies and Donald Trump have expressed interest in the project. The relocation of the port will free up a considerable amount of coastline on the gulf for redevelopment for tourism purposes and connection of the port to Israel Railways' network would ensure a significant increase in the amount of cargo traffic passing through the port. The railway would also help boost tourism which took a hit with the shutdown of Eilat Airport and Sde Dov Airport in 2019, making domestic travel to Eilat more time-consuming and cumbersome.

In January 2012, the Minister of Transportation instructed the Israel Port Authority to begin a preliminary survey of the land to determine the optimal location of an excavated port north of Eilat.

Environmental protection
Due to environmental concerns, the Eilat Port Authority spent millions to build a loader that prevents phosphate dust from dispersing into the sea.

See also
Eilat Airport
Ovda International Airport
Taba Border Crossing
Ramon Airport
Yotvata Airfield

References

Biography

External links
 Official site

Eilat
Eilat